The Vanderbilt Museum is located in Centerport on the North Shore of Long Island in Suffolk County, New York, USA. Named for William Vanderbilt II (1878–1944), it is located on his former  estate, Eagle's Nest.

History
William K. Vanderbilt II's will provided for donation of his property to the county, with provision that the mansion and grounds be used for a museum for his marine, natural history, and ethnographic collections; the natural history institution was established during 1950. Developing a museum that interprets Vanderbilt's life, times, and collections, the county constructed a planetarium on the grounds during 1970.

Vanderbilt's enclave was constructed in three installments. The first project was the building of a 24-room Spanish revival mansion designed by famed New York architecture firm Warren and Wetmore, one of two firms responsible for designing and constructing New York's Grand Central Terminal, another product of the Vanderbilt family execution. The duration of the three stages lasted from 1910 to 1936.

The museum complex, operated by Suffolk County, includes the mansion with furnishings and fine art, a marine museum with marine and natural history specimens (butterflies, birds, shells, mammals and fish), a curator's cottage, a seaplane hangar, a boathouse, gardens, and a collection of ethnographic objects (firearms and swords, ship models, and European, Asian and African objects).  The museum was listed on the National Register of Historic Places on September 26, 1985.

Living History Tours 
Once a week during the summer, the museum offers a "living history tour" of the museum. Acting in costume, the staff enacts a performance about the era of the Gold Coast socialites, drawing on information gleaned from Vanderbilt's personal journal and historical archives about other owners and workers.

Planetarium 
The planetarium opened in 1971. It became "the forerunner, the prototype of so many others that were subsequently built around this country,” said Mark Levine, director of the planetarium and associate professor of astronomy at Hofstra University.

In 2013, the planetarium reopened after a major renovation that replaced the roof, carpets, and seats; and upgraded the gift shop, lobby, ticket office, and other interior and exterior features. The planetarium includes a Konica Minolta GeminiStar III projector, full dome display projector, and surround-sound technology.

Gallery

References

External links 
The Vanderbilt Museum's website
Suffolk County Listings on the National Register of Historic Places

Houses on the National Register of Historic Places in New York (state)
Natural history museums in New York (state)
Museums in Suffolk County, New York
Mansions of Gold Coast, Long Island
Planetaria in the United States
National Register of Historic Places in Huntington (town), New York
Vanderbilt family residences
Historic house museums in New York (state)
Houses in Suffolk County, New York